The Howrah - Raxaul Express is an Express train belonging to Eastern Railway zone that runs between Howrah Junction and RaxaulJunction in India. It is currently being operated with 13043/13044 train numbers on twice in a week basis.

Overview 

It runs from Howrah Junction to Raxaul Junction on Wednesdays and Fridays of every week. In the reverse direction it runs on Thursdays and Saturdays of every week. It connects important stations like Asansol, Jhajha, Barauni, Samastipur, Darbhanga, Sitamarhi. The 13043/Howrah - Raxaul Express has an average speed of 41 km/hr and covers 699 km in 16h 55m. The 13044/Raxaul - Howrah Express has an average speed of 44 km/hr and covers 699 km in 15h 45m.

Timing and halts 

The train departs from Platform #8 of Howrah Junction at 22:50 and arrives in Raxaul Junction at 15:45, the next day. From Raxaul Junction, the train departs at 20:30 and arrives in Howrah Junction at 12:15, the next day.

The important halts of the train are:

Coach composite

The train consists 15 standard ICF coaches. It does not carry any pantry car:

 2 AC II Tier Cum III Tiers
 5 Sleeper Classes
 6 General (Unreserved)
 2 Seating (Disabled/Ladies) Cum Luggage Rakes

Traction

As the track between Muzaffarpur and Raxaul is not electrified so a Samastipur Diesel Loco Shed based WDM3D locomotive powers the train for its journey from Barauni Junction to Raxaul railway station. The rest part of the journey is covered by an Howrah Loco Shed based electric locomotive WAP 4 or WAM 4 and vice versa.

See also 

 Howrah Junction railway station
 Raxaul Junction railway station
 Mithila Express

Notes

External links 

 13043/Howrah - Raxaul Express
 13044/Raxaul - Howrah Express

References 

Rail transport in Howrah
Transport in Raxaul
Express trains in India
Rail transport in West Bengal
Rail transport in Jharkhand
Rail transport in Bihar
Railway services introduced in 2014